Mohammadyar District is in Naqadeh County, West Azerbaijan province, Iran. At the 2006 National Census, its population was 21,744 in 4,881 households. The following census in 2011 counted 21,318 people in 5,961 households. At the latest census in 2016, the district had 21,147 inhabitants in 6,123 households.

References 

Naqadeh County

Districts of West Azerbaijan Province

Populated places in West Azerbaijan Province

Populated places in Naqadeh County